Mieczysław Stanisław Jaskierski (born December 17, 1950) is a retired Polish ice hockey player. He played for the Poland men's national ice hockey team at the 1976 Winter Olympics in Innsbruck.

References

1950 births
Living people
Ice hockey players at the 1976 Winter Olympics
Olympic ice hockey players of Poland
People from Nowy Targ
Polish ice hockey right wingers
Sportspeople from Lesser Poland Voivodeship